Antonieta is a Portuguese feminine given name that is a diminutive form of Antónia in use in Brazil, Portugal, South Africa, Namibia, Mozambique and Angola. Notable people with this name include the following:

Given name
Antonieta de Barros (1901–1952), Brazilian journalist and politician
Antonieta Figueroa (born 1934), Mexican painter
Antonieta Galleguillos (born 1990), Chilean judoka
Antonieta Rosa Gomes (born 1959), Bissau-Guinean politician
Antonieta Sosa (born 1940), American artist

Middle name
María Antonieta Cámpoli (born 1955), Italian beauty pageant titleholders
María Antonieta Collins (born 1952), Mexican journalist and author
María Antonieta de Bográn (born 1955), Honduran politician
María Antonieta de las Nieves, stage name of María Antonieta Gómez-Rodríguez (born 1950), Mexican actress
María Antonieta Duque (born 1970), Venezuelan comedian and actress
María Antonieta Gutiérrez, Venezuelan script writer
María Antonieta Hernández (born 1958), Mexican gymnast
María Antonieta Pérez Reyes (born 1963), Mexican politician
María Antonieta Pons (1922–2004), Cuban film actress

See also

Antonietta (given name)
Antoñita (disambiguation), given name/nickname

References

Portuguese feminine given names